Marisa Gabrielle Abela (born 7 December 1996) is an English actress. She is known for her roles in the BBC Two and HBO series Industry (2020–) and the Sky One series COBRA (2020). She has a forthcoming role as the late singer Amy Winehouse in the film Back to Black.

Early life and education
Marisa Abela was born in Brighton to actress Caroline Gruber and director Angelo Abela and grew up in Rottingdean with her older brother Jack. Her father is of Maltese-Libyan and English descent, and her mother is of Polish Jewish and Russian Jewish ancestry. She attended Roedean School and took drama classes with the Theatre Workshop. She initially intended to study History and Law at UCL and become a human rights lawyer, but changed her mind last minute and decided to pursue acting instead. She went on to graduate from the Royal Academy of Dramatic Art (RADA) in 2019.

Career
Abela first appeared aged 11 as the character Alice in the thriller Man in a Box (2008).

After graduating from RADA, Abela made her television debut in 2020 with main roles in the Sky One political thriller COBRA as Ellie Sutherland and the BBC Two and HBO office drama Industry as Yasmin Kara-Hanani. She appeared in the 2022 films She Is Love and Rogue Agent.

In July 2022, Abela joined the cast of Greta Gerwig's Barbie (2023).  Later that month, it was rumoured Abela was in early talks to star as Amy Winehouse in Sam Taylor-Johnson's Back To Black, a biopic about the late singer. In January 2023, the role was confirmed with a promotional image of Abela as Winehouse. Filming commenced that month in London.

Filmography

Film

Television

Video games

References

External links
 

1996 births
21st-century English actresses
Actresses from Brighton
Alumni of RADA
English people of Libyan descent
English people of Maltese descent
English people of Polish-Jewish descent
English people of Russian-Jewish descent
Jewish English actresses
Living people
People educated at Roedean School, East Sussex